Sampaloc station is situated on the PNR Southrail line in Gainza, Camarines Sur. It is still use for the Bicol Commuter. The station served Brgy. Sampaloc, Gainza, Camarines Sur.

Philippine National Railways stations
Railway stations in Camarines Sur